The 1970 International cricket season was from May 1970 to September 1970. However, there were no any international match held during this season. The season consisted with 1970 English cricket season where they held 1970 County Championship from 25 July to 25 August, 1970 Gillette Cup and 1970 John Player League. However, Rest of the World XI toured England for an unofficial Test series. At the time, they were played as Test matches, but that status was later revoked by the International Cricket Conference (ICC) and they are now termed unofficial Tests, though still officially first-class matches.

Season overview

June

World XI in England

References

1970 in cricket